The Beautiful is an epithet given to:

People:
Helen II of Croatia (died c. 1091), Queen of Croatia
John II Komnenos (1087–1143), Byzantine Emperor

Fictional or mythological characters:
Ara the Beautiful, legendary Armenian hero
Vasilisa the Beautiful, heroine of a Russian folk tale

See also
List of people known as the Handsome
List of people known as the Fair

Lists of people by epithet